Anne Solsvik (born 25 February 1981) is a Norwegian politician for the Liberal Party (Venstre). She became State Secretary at Ministry of Education and Research in 2020; until 2020 she was a partner at First House.

Between 2007 and 2010 she was the leader of the Young Liberals of Norway, the youth wing of the Liberal Party. Upon her election she stated that her most important goal was to work for Norwegian membership in the European Union.

Solsvik is also a member of the city council in her home town Arendal.

References

1981 births
Living people
Liberal Party (Norway) politicians
People from Arendal
21st-century Norwegian politicians